The Men's road race cycling events at the 2016 Summer Paralympics took place on September 17 at  Flamengo Park, Pontal. Events took place over eight events, spanning twelve classifications.

Classification
Cyclists are given a classification depending on the type and extent of their disability. The classification system allows cyclists to compete against others with a similar level of function. The class number indicates the severity of impairment with "1" being most impaired.

Cycling classes are:
B: Blind and visually impaired cyclists use a Tandem bicycle with a sighted pilot on the front
H 1–4: Cyclists with an impairment that affects their legs use a handcycle
T 1–2: Cyclists with an impairment that affects their balance use a tricycle
C 1-5: Cyclists with an impairment that affects their legs, arms and/or trunk but are capable of using a standard bicycle

Men's road races

B

H2

H3

H4

H5

C1-3

C4-5

T1-2

References

Men's road race